Helmut Graf (born 8 February 1963) is an Austrian football manager and former footballer who played as a defender.

External links
 

1963 births
Living people
Austrian footballers
FC Admira Wacker Mödling players
Austrian football managers
Association football defenders
Alemannia Aachen managers
People from Mistelbach
Footballers from Lower Austria